Malena Is a Name from a Tango is a 1996 drama film directed by Gerardo Herrero from a screenplay by Senel Paz based on the novel by Almudena Grandes. It stars Ariadna Gil.

Plot 
The plot concerns about the romantic and sexual endeavours of Malena, a victimised and rebellious woman contrasting to her twin sister Reina (who always was the model girl in the family), and then about the mother-son relationship of Malena with her son. Malena was gifted however a talisman by her grandfather back when she was 10.

Cast

Production 
An adaptation of the novel by Almudena Grandes, the screenplay was penned by Senel Paz. It is a Spanish-French-German co-production by Alta Films, Tornasol Films, Blue Dahlia Production, La Sept Cinema, and Road Movies Produktionen. Shooting locations included the San Julián estate (Lorca), Mula, Águilas, and Madrid.

Release 
Distributed by Alta Films, the film was theatrically released in Spain on 12 April 1996.

Reception 
Jonathan Holland of Variety deemed the film to be a "well-intentioned, provocatively moralizing women's pic that ends up as second-rate melodrama".

Luis Martínez of El País deemed that, efforts from a "magnetic" Ariadna Gil notwithstanding, the films "ends up as an uneven and quite chatty journey into the interiors of this disease called life".

See also 
 List of Spanish films of 1996

References

External links 

Films based on Spanish novels
Films shot in the Region of Murcia
1996 drama films
1990s Spanish films
1990s French films
1990s German films
1990s Spanish-language films
Films shot in Madrid
Tornasol Films films
Films directed by Gerardo Herrero